Parliamentary elections were held in Portugal on 20 October 1889. The result was a victory for the Progressive Party, which won 104 seats.

Results

The results exclude the six seats won at national level and those from overseas territories.

References

Legislative elections in Portugal
Portugal
1889 in Portugal
October 1889 events